is a train station on the Hankyu Kyoto Line located in Higashiyodogawa-ku, Osaka, Japan.

Layout
Two side platforms serving two tracks.

Adjacent stations

History
The station was opened by Kita-Osaka Electric Railway on April 1, 1921.

Station numbering was introduced to all Hankyu stations on 21 December 2013 with this station being designated as station number HK-62.

Future plans 
Construction is underway for grade separation. Work is being done as of 2019 to elevate a  section of the Kyoto Line between this station and Kami-Shinjō Station. Originally planned to be opened by 2020, various delays have resulted in the opening being pushed to 2031.

Surrounding area
Nakajima Soja
Sozen-ji
Kunijima Purification Plant (Osaka City Waterworks Bureau)
Kunijima Station (Senri Line)
Osaka Prefectural Kunijima High School
Osaka Municipal Nakajima Junior High School
Osaka Municipal Keihatsu Elementary School
Osaka Municipal Higashiyodogawa Gymnasium
Yodogawa Christian Hospital

References

External links

 Sozen-ji Station from Hankyu Railway website 

Hankyu Kyoto Main Line
Higashiyodogawa-ku, Osaka
Railway stations in Osaka
Railway stations in Japan opened in 1921